Raymond Elliott may refer to:

Ray Elliott (cricketer) (1917–1997), Australian cricketer
Ray Elliott (rugby union), Australian rugby union player
Ray Elliott (footballer) (born 1929), Welsh footballer
Raymond L. Elliott, geologist and namesake of Elliott Nunatak

See also
Ray Elliot (disambiguation)